East Fork Johnson Creek is a  long 2nd order tributary to Johnson Creek in Patrick County, Virginia.

Course 
East Fork Johnson Creek rises about 2.5 miles southeast of Willis Gap in Patrick County, Virginia and then flows southwest to join Johnson Creek about 6 miles south of Orchard Gap.

Watershed 
East Fork Johnson Creek drains  of area, receives about 51.6 in/year of precipitation, has a wetness index of 289.99, and is about 82% forested.

See also 
 List of Virginia Rivers

References 

Rivers of Patrick County, Virginia
Rivers of Virginia